Acrossocheilus macrophthalmus is a species of ray-finned fish in the genus Acrossocheilus which is endemic to northern Vietnam.

References

Macrophthalmus
Fish described in 2001

Endemic fauna of Vietnam